The Northern Ireland Youth Forum (NIYF) is a youth organisation in the United Kingdom, consisting of volunteer members aged between 11 and 25. Winners of the very first MTV voices award in 2011.

NIYF Executive Committee 
The NIYF is a youth led organisation that lobbies, advocates, promotes and fights for the rights of young people in Northern Ireland. The primary aim is to build the confidence and awareness of all young people so that they can assert their rights as listed by the United Nations Convention on the Rights of the Child.

The Executive Committee are responsible for the management of the Youth Forum. The Executive set the priorities for the Youth Forum and they employ a staff team to carry out this work.

The Committee for 2021 – 2022 were elected at the AGM on the 28th June 2021 and are listed below.

History 
The Northern Ireland Youth Forum was created by the Department of Education in 1979 to ensure that young people's opinions were heard and valued by government. As part of the Youth Sector, the Youth Forum was asked to help young people engage in decision-making about the delivery of services such as youth clubs, local youth councils, as well as in wider society.

Today the Youth Forum's mantra is ‘promoting the voice of young people’, and it works with young people across Northern Ireland to ensure they are able to fully participate in making decisions within their community.

Membership 
The Youth Forum is a member-based organisation, which means that it gets its direction and focus from the young people it is created to work for. Membership is open to all young people living in Northern Ireland aged between 11 and 25 who support the core values and aims of the Youth Forum.

Members are encouraged to take an active role in the life of the organisation, including standing for election to the executive committee. Members also receive our monthly email newsletter ‘eBumpfh’ that contains information about current work, training opportunities, and exciting events.

Members are encouraged to keep in touch with the Membership Development Worker to inform them of the work that they are doing in their local area or youth club. Through the online discussion forum Members can talk about issues that they care about, feed into ongoing consultations that are managed by the Youth Forum, and make friends with other Members.

Areas of focus 
The forum lists five main focal points of its work, detailed below.

 Working with young people
 Speaking up, fighting for and making change in Northern Ireland
 Getting young people involved in the work of the Northern Ireland Youth Forum
 Getting the message out from politicians, organisations and the forum
 Looking to the future and constantly improving the four aforementioned focal points.

UK Youth Parliament 
The NIYF also fills the position of a regional body of the UK Youth Parliament;  as such it remains involved in national and local campaigns.  Currently the forum holds positions on the Procedures group and Board of Trustees of the UKYP.

Footnotes

Youth model government
Youth-led organizations
Youth organisations based in the United Kingdom
Political organisations based in the United Kingdom
Youth empowerment organizations
1979 establishments in Northern Ireland